The 1977–78 season saw the 27th competition for the FDGB-Pokal of East Germany.

After a qualifying round with four teams from the second-tier DDR-Liga the first round proper was played with 55 teams from the DDR-Liga, the two teams that had been relegated from the DDR-Oberliga in 1976–77 and the 18 Bezirkspokal winners of 1977. From the round of last 16 onwards fixtures were decided over two legs. If the fixture could not be decided in regular time, extra time and penalty shoot-out were used.

After an intermediate round which saw all Bezirkspokal winners eliminated, with the exception of Motor Warnowwerft, the 2nd round proper saw the Oberliga teams entering the competition. Five Oberliga teams were eliminated in the 2nd round: Hallescher FC Chemie, 1. FC Union Berlin, Chemie Böhlen, Sachsenring Zwickau and Wismut Aue. The last Bezirkspokal winner was eliminated from the competition as well.

Last year's finalist 1. FC Lok Leipzig was eliminated in the round of last 16. Of the seven DDR-Liga sides that reached this round only three reached the quarterfinals, but were eliminated there. Title holders Dynamo Dresden again reached the final where they met four time FDGB-Pokal winners 1. FC Magdeburg.

Preliminary round

Round 1

Intermediate round

Round 2

Last 16

Quarterfinals

Semifinals

Final

Statistics

Match report 

The 1978 FDGB-Pokal final was a summit meeting of East German football in several ways. The opponents were Dynamo Dresden – three-time cup winners, four-time East German champions who were leading the DDR-Oberliga at the time – and 1. FC Magdeburg – three-time champions and four-time cup winners who were second in the league, trailing Dynamo by two points. 19 players on the pitch played for the national team, ten on Dynamo's and nine on Magdeburg's squad. Generally, Dynamo Dresden were regarded as favorites; Magdeburg had only got their best eleven back after a long injury break.

But the audience were in for a surprise: It was not Dynamo Dresden who took the game in their hands, but Magdeburg dictated play over the entire 90 minutes. Not only did Magdeburg take the lead early in the game, when their libero Manfred Zapf headed home after 8 minutes, but afterwards they attacked Dresden's goal relentlessly, generating no less than 23 dangerous attacks in the rest of the game. On the other side, Dresden had their first true opportunity only in the 74th minute. While Dresden's playmakers Dörner and Häfner could not get their team's play under control and their teammates lost most one-on-one duels, Magdeburg played a straightforward quick attacking game. Former East German international Otto Fräßdorf as a neutral spectator was convinced Magdeburg would be victorious even at half-time. After the break Dynamo tried hard to turn the game around, but their weak attacking play was foiled by Magdeburg's compact defending. Magdeburg's Raugust, Seguin and Decker were often able to initiate counter-attacks. As the sole defect of Magdeburg's game was their weak conversion ratio, the victory remained a slim one. Referee Prokop said in the aftermath: "A good final. Not one malicious foul. The level of play was also worthy of a final. There were a lot of scenes in the penalty area. Attractive advertising for good football."

Magdeburg had won the cup for the fifth time and the trophy was permanently given to the club.

References

1977-78
East
Cup